Orthetrum taeniolatum is an Asian freshwater dragonfly species. The common name for this species is small skimmer. Its range of distribution spreads from eastern Europe to China, and the species itself is locally common throughout the range.

Description and habitat
It is a medium-sized dragonfly with brown capped eyes, greenish brown thorax and bluish abdomen. Female lacks the powder blue pruinescence. It prefers medium to slow-flowing streams in the dry zones and hot plains. Adults are common around open rocky and sandy beds of the streams.

See also
 List of odonates of Sri Lanka
 List of odonates of India
 List of odonata of Kerala

References

External links

Libellulidae
Insects described in 1845